La Bazoge may refer to several communes in France:

 La Bazoge, Manche, in the Manche département 
 La Bazoge, Sarthe, in the Sarthe département
 La Bazoge-Montpinçon, in the Mayenne département

See also

 Bazoges-en-Pareds, in the Vendée département
 La Bazouge-de-Chemeré, in the Mayenne département 
 La Bazouge-des-Alleux, in the Mayenne département 
 La Bazouge-du-Désert, in the Ille-et-Vilaine département
 Bazouges-la-Pérouse, in the Ille-et-Vilaine département 
 Bazouges-sur-le-Loir, in the Sarthe département